Stephen of Muret (1045 – 8 February 1124) was the  founder of the Abbey of Grandmont (the mother house) and the Order of Grandmont.

Hagiography
Serious chronological difficulties are presented by the traditional story of his early life (printed in Patrologia Latina 204, coll. 1005–1072), which runs as follows: Stephen in his twelfth year accompanied his father, the Viscount of Thiers, to Italy, where he was left to be educated by Milo, Archbishop of Benevento; after passing twelve years in this prelate's household, he became acquainted with hermits in Calabria, but never joined their way of life. He then returned to France to bid farewell to his parents, having formed the design of entering religion, but, finding them dead, returned to Italy.

His patron Milo having also died, he established himself at Rome, where he studied the rules of the religious houses of the city. After a four years' sojourn he obtained a Bull from Gregory VII authorizing him to found an institute resembling that of the solitaries he had frequented in Calabria, and returned to France. He is said to have settled at Muret in 1076 and died at Muret on 8 February 1124.  At Muret, he established the Order of Grandmont, a religious order of "extreme austerity and poverty."

This story is impossible; his father visited Italy in order to make a pilgrimage to St. Nicholas at Bari; but Nicholas's relics were not placed there till some years later; Milo was not Archbishop of Benevento for twelve years; the Gregory VII's bull is a forgery. The exact truth as to St. Stephen's life cannot now be established. However, the connexions with Milo, whose short episcopate (1074–75) would argue against any later invention by a biographer; the connexion, too, with Benevento, which held particular interest for reforming popes; and the lack of miracles during his life, would all argue for at least some details being historically sound.
 The Life would seem to have been originally written in the mid-twelfth century and to have been revised in the last decade of that century.

The quarrel as to what great order could claim Grandmont as its offspring, with the consequent forgeries, has done much to involve the founder's life in obscurity. Though Stephen was certainly the founder of the Order of Grandmont, he did little for his disciples except offer them the example of his holy life, and it was not till after his death that the order was firmly established.

Veneration

His head is preserved in the parish Church of St. Sylvestre, Canton of Laurière (in the Haute Vienne département).

He was canonized by Bishop Gerald II of Limoges in 1167 and by Pope Clement III in 1189. His liturgical feast occurs on 8 February.

See also
Chronological list of saints and blesseds in the 12th century
Grandmontines

References

Sources
His works (not authentic) may be found in Migne, P. L. CCIV, 997–1162.

1045 births
1124 deaths
People from Thiers
Benedictine monks
Benedictine abbots
Benedictine saints
French abbots
French Christian monks
12th-century French people
12th-century Christian monks
French Roman Catholic saints
Medieval French saints
Members of Catholic orders and societies
11th-century Christian saints
12th-century Christian saints
Founders of Catholic religious communities